The black-throated jay (Cyanolyca pumilo) is a species of bird in the family Corvidae. It is found in Chiapas, Guatemala and Honduras. Its natural habitat is subtropical or tropical moist montane forests.

References

black-throated jay
Birds of Mexico
Birds of Guatemala
Birds of Honduras
black-throated jay
Taxonomy articles created by Polbot